Savarkhed Ek Gaon is a 2004 Indian Marathi-language thriller film directed by Rajiv Patil. Produced by Laxmikant Bhattad, Shankar Bhattad and Rahul Bhattad. The film stars Ankush Chaudhari, Shreyas Talpade, Sharvari Jamenis, Sonali Khare, Vikram Gokhale, Sadashiv Amrapurkar in lead roles and Makarand Anaspure, Upendra Limaye in supporting roles.

Plot 
Savarkhed has been awarded as a model village by the government. MLA Patil and Sampatrao More are two politicians who are enmity against each other due to different ideologies. Patil's son Rahul returns to the village after completing his education in Israel. Ajay, Ishwar, Baban, Samita are his friends from the village. Sneha, a reporter from Mumbai, comes to the village and stays with Patil to cover the news of the village, making Rahul feel close to her Jealousy. Things are going well in everyone's lives until Patil leaves on a business trip and some strange things start happening that lead to the death of a few people.  Rahul and his friends have been infiltrated in their village by some unknown people who only work in the dark. They decide to stop this but wonder why these people are targeting their village.

Cast 

 Vikram Gokhale as Amdar/MLA Patil
 Sadashiv Amrapurkar as Sampatrao More 
 Ankush Chaudhari as Rahul Patil 
 Sonali Khare as Priya 
 Shreyas Talpade as Ajay 
 Sharvari Jamenis as Sneha 
 Makarand Anaspure as Ishya 
 Upendra Limaye as Suresh 
 Balkrishna Shinde as Baban 
 Sanjyot Hardikar as Sameeta 
 Prashant Patil as Ghopade

Release 
The film was theatrically released on 1 April 2004.

Soundtrack 

Music is composed by Ajay-Atul. Background score is by Chandresh, Siddharth and Suhas.

References

External links 

  
 Savarkhed Ek Gaon at Rotten Tomatoes

2004 films
Indian thriller films